The Galabri (Ancient Greek: Γαλάβριοι) were a Dardanian tribe, along with the Thunatae, mentioned by Strabo.

Name 
The tribe is mentioned by Ancient Greek author Strabo in his Geographica as  Galabrioi. The tribal name Galabri/Galabrioi has been connected to the Messapic name Calabri/Calabrioi in Apulia (south-eastern Italy). It has been further connected to the Albanian toponym Gallapi in present-day north-eastern Kosovo.

Geography 
According to Strabo an old city was located in the region of the Dardanian tribe of the Galabri. It has been tentatively suggested that it should be sought at Kale in Skopje.

Strabo's account indicates higher social development and acculturation in the area; also the informations provided by other classical sources concerning the Dardanians suggest that their society was at an advanced phase of development.

See also

Dardania (Roman province)
List of ancient tribes in Illyria

References

Bibliography 

Dardanians
Illyrian tribes
Thracian tribes
Ancient tribes in Serbia
Ancient tribes in North Macedonia
Ancient tribes in Kosovo